"Angel of God" is a Roman Catholic traditional prayer for the intercession of the guardian angel, often taught to young children as the first prayer learned. It serves as a reminder of God's love, and by enjoining the guardian angel to support the child in a loving way, the prayer echoes God's abiding love.

The original Latin prayer consists of two rhyming couplets. The customary English form of the prayer is metrical as well as rhyming. In many languages the customary form of the prayer is a direct prose translation of the Latin, while in others (for instance Polish) a poetic translation predominates.

Latin text

English translation

Sources
 

Roman Catholic prayers

Notes